Adam Block is the name of:

 Adam Block (astrophotographer) (born 1973), American astronomer
 Adam Block (music critic) (1951–2008), American music critic